Fossombronia is a genus of liverworts belonging to the family Fossombroniaceae.

The genus was first described by Giuseppe Raddi in 1818.

The genus has cosmopolitan distribution.

Species:
 Fossombronia alaskana Steere & Inoue
 Fossombronia brasiliensis Steph.
 Fossombronia foveolata Lindb.
 Fossombronia hispidissima Steph.
 Fossombronia lamellata Steph.
 Fossombronia longiseta (Austin) Austin
 Fossombronia macounii Austin
 Fossombronia wondraczekii (Corda) Dumort.
 Fossombronia zygospora R.M. Schust.

References

Fossombroniales
Liverwort genera